The partition algebra is an associative algebra with a basis of set-partition diagrams and multiplication given by diagram concatenation. Its subalgebras include diagram algebras such as the Brauer algebra, the Temperley–Lieb algebra, or the group algebra of the symmetric group. Representations of the partition algebra are built from sets of diagrams and from representations of the symmetric group.

Definition

Diagrams 

A partition of  elements labelled  is represented as a diagram, with lines connecting elements in the same subset. In the following example, the subset  gives rise to the lines , and could equivalently be represented by the lines  (for instance).

The concatenated diagram comes with a factor , where  is the number of connected components that are disconnected from the top and bottom elements.

Generators and relations 

The partition algebra  is generated by  elements of the type

These generators obey relations that include

Other elements that are useful for generating subalgebras include

In terms of the original generators, these elements are

Properties 

The partition algebra  is an associative algebra. It has a multiplicative identity

Subalgebras

Eight subalgebras 

Subalgebras of the partition algebra can be defined by the following properties:
 Whether they are planar i.e. whether lines may cross in diagrams.
 Whether subsets are allowed to have any size , or size , or only size .
 Whether we allow top-top and bottom-bottom lines, or only top-bottom lines.

Combining these properties gives rise to 8 nontrivial subalgebras, in addition to the partition algebra itself:

The Motzkin algebra is sometimes called the dilute Temperley–Lieb algebra in the physics literature.

Properties 

Inclusions of planar into non-planar algebras:

Inclusions from constraints on subset size:

Inclusions from allowing top-top and bottom-bottom lines:

We have the isomorphism:

More subalgebras 

In addition to the eight subalgebras described above, other subalgebras have been defined:
 The totally propagating partition subalgebra  is generated by diagrams whose blocks all propagate, i.e. partitions whose subsets all contain top and bottom elements.
 The quasi-partition algebra  is generated by subsets of size at least two.
 The uniform block permutation algebra  is generated by subsets with as many top elements as bottom elements.

Periodic subalgebras are generated by diagrams that can be drawn on an annulus without line crossings. Such subalgebras include a translation element  such that . The translation element and its powers are the only combinations of  that belong to periodic subalgebras.

Representations

Structure 

Such partitions are represented by diagrams with no top-top lines, with at least one line for each top element. For example, in the case :

The dimension of this representation is

A basis of  can be described combinatorially in terms of set-partition tableaux: Young tableaux whose boxes are filled with the blocks of a set partition.

Assuming that  is semisimple, the representation  is irreducible, and the 
set of irreducible finite-dimensional representations of the partition algebra is

Representations of subalgebras 

Representations of non-planar subalgebras have similar structures as representations of the partition algebra. For example, the Brauer-Specht modules of the Brauer algebra are built from Specht modules, and certain sets of partitions.

In the case of the planar subalgebras, planarity prevents nontrivial permutations, and Specht modules do not appear.

The following table lists the irreducible representations of the partition algebra and eight subalgebras.

Schur-Weyl duality 

Assume .
For  a -dimensional vector space with basis , there is a natural action of the partition algebra  on the vector space . This action is defined by the matrix elements of a partition  in the basis :

This matrix element is one if all indices corresponding to any given partition subset coincide, and zero otherwise. For example, the action of a Temperley–Lieb generator is

Duality between the partition algebra and the symmetric group 

Let  be integer.
Let us take  to be the natural permutation representation of the symmetric group . This -dimensional representation is a sum of two irreducible representations: the standard and trivial representations, .

Dualities involving subalgebras 

The duality between the symmetric group and the partition algebra generalizes the original Schur-Weyl duality between the general linear group and the symmetric group. There are other generalizations. In the relevant tensor product spaces, we write  for an irreducible -dimensional representation of the first group or algebra:

References

Further reading

Representation theory
Diagram algebras